Matthew Aloysius "Matches" Kilroy  (June 21, 1866 – March 2, 1940) was an American left-handed pitcher in Major League Baseball. In 1886, he had 513 strikeouts, which remains the MLB single-season record.

Early life
Kilroy was born in Philadelphia in 1866. He was one of 13 children of Mary Ann and Patrick Kilroy. He started his professional baseball career with the Southern League's Augusta Browns in 1885. That season, he pitched 447 innings and had a win–loss record of 29–22 with a 0.97 earned run average and 363 strikeouts.

Rookie season
Kilroy starred as an MLB rookie during the  season for the last-place Baltimore Orioles. He started 68 games, completing 66 of them while throwing 583 innings. Although he had a disappointing record of 29 wins and 34 losses, he set a mark that was unequalled in major league pitching. During this period there were many differences in game play from the modern rules, such as a base on balls being awarded after six balls rather than the modern four, and the pitcher being located 50 feet from home plate rather than the modern 60 feet 6 inches; it was also the last season in which batters could request either a high pitch or a low pitch. Because of these numerous subsequent rule changes, pitching records from that era are not officially compared to those of the modern era, which is variously regarded as beginning in 1893 (when the modern pitching distance was established) or 1901.

On August 20, Kilroy and Cyclone Miller of the Philadelphia Quakers hurled opposing one-hitters, the first time this ever occurred, though it has since been duplicated four times. Baltimore won that game 1–0 on first-inning errors‚ but did not get a hit until the ninth. During this remarkable rookie season, he hurled 5 shutouts, 3 one-hitters, and 4 two-hitters, but on October 6 he pitched the only 9-inning no-hitter of his career. He pitched his gem against the Pittsburgh Alleghenys, a 6–0 victory.

Second season
Baltimore began to score more runs, finishing in a respectable third place; in addition, Kilroy lowered his earned run average from 3.37 to 3.07, resulting in an outstanding win–loss record of 46–19. During his sophomore year he started 69 games, completing 66 while throwing 589 innings with 6 shutouts. He led the league in wins and shutouts. He had this success even though his strikeout total dropped dramatically to 217. Kilroy pitched and won both games of a doubleheader twice during the 1887 season, once on July 26 and the other on October 1. His 46 wins is still the most ever by a left-handed pitcher in a season. On September 2, he umpired his only game.

Later career

Baltimore finished in fifth place, and Kilroy had a 17–21 record in only 40 games. He did complete 35 of those starts and recorded 2 shutouts. Earlier, before the season started and after signing his contract with the team, he married Fanny Denny, although he did spend the honeymoon training with the Orioles.

The  season was Kilroy's comeback season and his last productive season as a pitcher. He completed 55 of his 56 starts, while also pitching in 3 relief appearances, the first of his career. He had a 29–25 record and 5 shutouts in 480 innings. On July 29 of that season, he pitched his second no-hitter, this time a 7-inning affair against the St. Louis Browns that ended in scoreless tie. It was Kilroy's own baserunning error that negated the only run scored, when he missed third base in the 3rd inning and was called out.

That season was his last for Baltimore, as he jumped to the new Players' League for the  season. He had a disappointing season, winning only 9 games against 15 losses in 217 innings. He only completed 18 of 27 starts for the Boston Reds, and only struck out 48. After the Players' League folded, he traveled around, playing for three teams during the next four seasons, never pitching more than 45 innings. He finished his career with 141 wins and 133 losses in 303 games pitched.

Later life
After his baseball career ended, Kilroy lived in Philadelphia and owned a saloon. He and his wife had seven children. Kilroy died at the age of 73; he was buried at the Holy Sepulchre Cemetery in Cheltenham Township, Pennsylvania.

See also

List of Major League Baseball no-hitters
List of Major League Baseball annual wins leaders
List of Major League Baseball annual strikeout leaders
List of Major League Baseball annual shutout leaders
List of Major League Baseball career hit batsmen leaders

References

External links

1866 births
1940 deaths
19th-century baseball players
Major League Baseball pitchers
Baltimore Orioles (AA) players
Boston Reds (PL) players
Burials at Holy Sepulchre Cemetery
Cincinnati Kelly's Killers players
Washington Senators (1891–1899) players
Louisville Colonels players
Chicago Orphans players
Augusta Browns players
Philadelphia Athletics (minor league) players
Syracuse Stars (minor league baseball) players
Hartford Indians players
Baseball players from Philadelphia